Linda Bangs (sometimes known professionally as Linda Bangs-Urban) is a professional baritone saxophonist and was born in Waverly, Tioga County, New York.

She was a founding member of the Raschèr Saxophone Quartet and studied under Sigurd Raschèr as well as Laurence Wyman.

Bangs teaches saxophone at the Academy for Music in Darmstadt, Germany. She has performed widely in the USA and Europe and appears on numerous commercial recordings.

In 1990, Bangs founded the Süddeutsches Saxophon-Kammerorchester (South German Saxophone Chamber Orchestra).

The American composer J. Ryan Garber composed Another Twist for Bangs. It was premiered in Darmstadt, Germany, on March 3, 2007, and subsequently recorded and released on the Contrasts CD.

Discography
 Chamber Music for Baritone Saxophone (Coronet, 1997)
 Saxazione
 Several recordings with the Raschèr Saxophone Quartet
 Contrasts: Kammermusik für Baritonsaxophon (Antes/Bella Musica)

References

External links
 [ Discography at Allmusic]
Biography at Darmstadt Academy
Mentioned in article about Rascher

American classical saxophonists
Classical musicians from New York (state)
Classical saxophonists
Living people
People from Waverly, Tioga County, New York
Women saxophonists
Year of birth missing (living people)
21st-century saxophonists